54th meridian may refer to:

54th meridian east, a line of longitude east of the Greenwich Meridian
54th meridian west, a line of longitude west of the Greenwich Meridian